Alex Roshuk (July 14, 1956 – November 9, 2014) was an American attorney who was the first legal advisor to the Wikimedia Foundation. He was also an electrician and worked in the entertainment industry as a director and editor.

Roshuk was born in New York City and went to Catholic school.

He practiced law in New York beginning in 1998 and from 2003 to 2005 was the first legal advisor to the Wikimedia Foundation. Roshuk wrote a 1,300-word summary of arbitration and mediation modes of legal dispute resolution that became the basis for the Wikipedia Arbitration Committee. He was also a participant in the Association of Arbitrators of the New York City Civil Court.

He directed several educational television documentaries in Italian and a short film entitled  in 1981. He also founded The Standby Program, a nonprofit organization for postproduction.

Roshuk was also an electrical engineer and entertained children as "Brooklyn Santa" from 1966 until at least 2012.

References

External links
Alex Roshuk at Justia

Roshuk, Alexis T. at Public Register of Arms, Flags and Badges (Governor General of Canada)

1956 births
2014 deaths
American electrical engineers
Film directors from New York City
New York (state) lawyers
Wikimedia Foundation people
Engineers from New York City
20th-century American lawyers